Batman is a fictional superhero appearing in comic books published by DC Comics.

Batman or The Batman may also refer to:

Art, entertainment, and media

Characters
 Batman (Terry McGinnis)
 Batman (Thomas Wayne)
 Batman (Earth-Two)
 Batman of Zur-En-Arrh
 Batman (Gotham television series character)
 Batman (DC Extended Universe character)
 Batman (Dark Knight trilogy character)
 Batman (1989 film series character)
 Batman (Jace Fox)

Print media 

 Batman (comic book), a comic book published from 1940 to the present, focusing on the mainstream version of the character
 Batman (comic strip), in newspapers from 1943 to 1991
 Batman (manga), several comic series published in Japan

Films 

 Batman (1966 film), based on the 1966 television series
 Batman (1989 film) 
 Batman (serial), a 1943 film serial
 The Batman (film), a 2022 film

Television
 Batman (TV series), 1966–1968 television series
 Batman: The Animated Series, a 1992 animated series
 The Batman (TV series), a 2000s animated series
 Batman: The Brave and the Bold, a 2008–2011 animated series

Video games 

 Batman (1986 video game), for Amstrad CPC, MSX, and ZX Spectrum
 Batman (1989 video game), for Amiga, Amstrad CPC, Atari ST, Commodore 64, MS-DOS, MSX, and ZX Spectrum
 Batman: The Video Game, released in 1989 for NES and Game Boy
 Batman (Sega Genesis video game), released in 1990
 Batman (1990 arcade game), released by Atari
 Batman (2013 arcade game), released by Raw Thrills
 Batman: The Telltale Series, released by Telltale Games in 2016
 Batman: The Enemy Within, the sequel released by Telltale Games in 2017

Music 
 Batman (album), an album by Prince
 Batman (score), the film score by Danny Elfman for the 1989 film
 "The Batman Theme", theme to the 1989 film, appearing on Batman (score)
 "Batman Theme", by Neal Hefti for the 1960s television show, and recorded by many artists since
 Batman! (Jan and Dean song), based on the theme by Neal Hefti
 "Batman", a 2017 song by Jaden Smith from the album Syre
 The Batman (soundtrack), the film score by Michael Giacchino for the 2022 film
 "The Batman", theme to the 2022 film, appearing on The Batman (soundtrack)

Toy line
 Batman (2003 toy line), six-inch model figures

Places

Australia 
 Division of Batman, a former electoral district in Melbourne, Victoria, named after one of the city's founders, John Batman
 Batman railway station

Iran
 Batman, Iran, a village in Kermanshah Province, Iran

Turkey 
 Batman, Turkey, a city in the Southeastern Anatolia Region
 Batman Province
 Batman District
 Batman, Tunceli
 Batman (electoral district)
 Batman River

People
 Batman (surname), a surname (and list of people with the name)

As nickname or stage name
 Antonis Fotsis (born 1981), Greek basketball player also known as Batman
 Haim Gozali (born 1973), Israeli mixed martial artist also known as Batman
 Marques Houston (born 1981), American entertainer also known as Batman
 Bershawn Jackson (born 1983), American athlete also known as Batman
 The Batman rapist, a UK murderer and rapist

Other uses 
 Batman (military), a soldier assigned as a personal valet to a commissioned officer
 Batman (truck), a monster truck that debuted in 2006
 Batman (unit), a historical unit of measure
 Batman: The Ride, a steel inverted roller coaster 
 B.A.T.M.A.N., a mesh network routing protocol
 Bayesian tool for methylation analysis, also known as BATMAN
 Batman, a junior synonym of the fish genus Cryptocentrus

See also 

 Man-Bat, a DC Comics character
 List of DC Comics characters named Batman, other superheroes who adopted the identity
 Batman franchise media, for the DC Comics franchise
 Batman and Robin
 Batman's Treaty, a treaty between John Batman and a group of Wurundjeri elders for the rental of Aboriginal lands
 Bathmen, a municipality in the Netherlands
 Batsman, in stick-and-ball sports
 Battman (Tony Silipini, 1931–2021), American wrestler
 Batter (disambiguation)
 Bruce Wayne (disambiguation)
 Vampire (disambiguation)